This is the discography for American rock musician Eric Johnson.

Albums

Studio albums

Live albums

Video albums

Instructional videos

Singles

Other appearances

References

Discographies of American artists
Blues discographies
Jazz discographies
Rock music discographies